Ágota Kristóf (30 October 1935 – 27 July 2011) was a Hungarian writer who lived in Switzerland and wrote in French. Kristof received the European prize for French literature for The Notebook (1986). She won the 2001 Gottfried Keller Award in Switzerland and the Austrian State Prize for European Literature in 2008.

Early life 
Ágota Kristóf was born in Csikvánd, Hungary on 30 October 1935. Her parents were Kálmán Kristóf, an elementary school teacher and Antónia Turchányi, a professor of arts. At the age of 21 she had to leave her country when the Hungarian anti-communist revolution was suppressed by the Soviet military. She, her husband (who used to be her history teacher at school) and their 4-month-old daughter escaped to Neuchâtel in Switzerland. After five years of loneliness and exile, she quit her work in a factory and left her husband. She started studying French and began to write novels in that language. It is worth noting that Ágota Kristóf said: "Two years in a USSR prison would have probably been better than five years in a factory in Switzerland."

Career 
 
Kristóf's first steps as a writer were in the realm of poetry and theater (John et Joe, Un rat qui passe), aspects of her writing that did not have as great an impact as her prose. In 1986 Kristóf's first novel, The Notebook, appeared. It was the beginning of a trilogy. The sequel titled The Proof came two years later. The third part was published in 1991 under the title The Third Lie. The most important themes of this trilogy are war and destruction, love and loneliness, promiscuous, desperate, and attention-seeking sexual encounters, desire and loss, truth and fiction.

She received the European prize for French Literature for The Notebook. This novel was translated into more than 40 languages. In 1995 she published a new novel, Yesterday. Kristóf also wrote a book called L'analphabète (in English The Illiterate) and published in 2004. This is an autobiographical text. It explores her love of reading as a young child, and we travel with her to boarding school, over the border to Austria and then to Switzerland. Forced to leave her country due to the failure of the anti-communist rebellion, she hopes for a better life in Zürich.

The majority of her works were published by Editions du Seuil in Paris. Recently two new short stories published at Mini Zoe collection entitled "Où es-tu Mathias?" (2006) and "Line, le temps". The names Mathias and Line are from her previous novels.

She died on 27 July 2011 in her Neuchâtel home. Her estate is archived in the Swiss Literary Archives in Bern.

Bibliography

Novels 
Le Grand Cahier (1986). The Notebook, trans. Alan Sheridan (Grove/Methuen, 1988)
 La Preuve (1988). The Proof, trans. David Watson (Grove/Methuen, 1991)
 Le Troisième Mensonge (1991). The Third Lie, trans. Marc Romano (Grove, 1996)
 Hier (1995). Yesterday, trans. David Watson (Random House of Canada, 1997). 
L'Analphabète (2004). The Illiterate, trans. Nina Bogin (CB Editions, 2014). 
 C'est égal (2005)
 Où es-tu Mathias ? (2006)

Plays 

 L'Heure grise, et autres pièces (1998)
 Le Monstre, et autres pièces (2007)

Poems 

 Clous: Poèmes hongrois et français (2016). Translations by Maria Maïlat.

English compilations 
The Notebook, The Proof, The Third Lie: Three Novels (Grove Press, 1997). 
The Book of Lies (Minerva, 1997). 
The Notebook Trilogy (Text Publishing, 2016) 
Collected Plays (Oberon Books, 2018). . Includes nine plays translated by Bart Smet: John and Joe, The Lift Key, A Passing Rat, The Grey Hour or the Last Client, The Monster, The Road, The Epidemic, The Atonement, and Line, of times

In popular culture 
The video game Mother 3 (2006) was influenced by The Notebook'''s major themes. Main characters Lucas and Claus are named after the book's narrators. The game's designer, Shigesato Itoi, a published author in his own right, compared the novel favorably to an RPG. American novelist Stephen Beachy has named Kristóf as an influence on his novel boneyard.Brucio nel vento (I burn in the Wind, 2002) is a film based on the novel Hier (Yesterday), directed by Silvio Soldini. Le Continent K. (1998) and Agota Kristof, 9 ans plus tard ...  (2006) are two short documentaries about Ágota Kristóf directed by Eric Bergkraut.The Notebook'' was adapted into a film in 2013 by director János Szász. 

In 2014, the novel was adapted for the stage by British contemporary theatre company, Forced Entertainment.

References

 Short bio at pwf.cz
  Biography at culturactif.ch

External links
 Literary estate of Ágota Kristóf in the archive database HelveticArchives of the Swiss National Library
Publications by and about Ágota Kristóf in the catalogue Helveticat of the Swiss National Library
 Interview on 13 October 2006 at www.hlo.hu
 Bio and links at europeanliteraryimmigration.com
 Review of The Notebook by Slavoj Žižek

Exophonic writers
Hungarian women novelists
Swiss women novelists
Swiss writers in French
1935 births
2011 deaths
Swiss women writers
20th-century Swiss novelists
20th-century Hungarian women writers
20th-century Hungarian novelists
Prix du Livre Inter winners